The Battle of Kock was the final battle in the invasion of Poland at the beginning of World War II in Europe. It took place between 2–5 October 1939, near the town of Kock, in Poland.

The Polish Independent Operational Group Polesie, led by General Franciszek Kleeberg, fought the German XIV Motorized Corps, led by General Gustav Anton von Wietersheim.

Before the battle
The Polish battle plan was disorganized due to few officers being available. The Wehrmacht had destroyed the Polish reserve and forced it to withdraw. Having taken heavy losses, the Polish armies retreated to Kraków and the Vistula river. From there, they took the route from Warsaw to Sandomierz. From Sandomierz, they were able to move on to the Lublin area.

The eastern edge of the Vistula was defended by Lublin's weak army. The Polish forces were only camped in areas where they could cross the river easily (in case of an attack). Other German forces advanced to the Vistula and went on towards Zamość and Volodymyr-Volynskyi.

The Polish Army at Kraków and Małopolska suffered heavy losses, and did not reach the San river front. Therefore, they were unable to organize a proper defense. Marshal Rydz Śmigły was tasked with the defense of southern Poland. The commander of army area IX Brześć, General Kleeberg, was responsible for the defense of the line from Pińsk to Brześć.

Group organization
On 8 September, General Kleeberg received orders from Marshal Rydz-Śmigły to organize a division of infantry from the depot division (a depot was where reserve soldiers and recruits were trained). General Kleeberg was also ordered to organize a defensive line from Brześć to Pińsk. While his forces were well-trained, they lacked heavy equipment as it had previously been dispatched to the front-line divisions.

Battle of Brześć Litewski and Kobryń

After breaking through the Polish line in the Battle of Wizna, the German XIX Army Corps under General Heinz Guderian started its rapid advance south. The corps, composed of the 3rd Panzer Division, the 10th Panzer Division, the 20th Motorized Infantry Division, with the 2nd Motorized Division in reserve, was ordered to capture the old fortress in Brześć Litewski and then strike further southwards towards Kowel and Galicia. The purpose of this attack was to cut Poland in two and paralyze the defenses east of the Bug River.

Initially, Guderian's forces advanced almost unopposed. However, on 14 September, they were stopped in the area of Brześć Fortress and Kobryn by a four-battalion-strong improvised force under General Konstanty Plisowski. In the three-day-long battle, which became known as the Battle of Brześć Litewski, both sides suffered significant casualties. Although the Poles finally withdrew from the area on 17 September, the Germans did not start the pursuit soon enough to rout the retreating Poles. The simultaneous attack on Kobryn, which is sometimes referred to as the Battle of Kobryń, was inconclusive, with the Polish improvised 'Kobryń' Infantry Division under Colonel Adam Epler withdrawing unopposed.

Both Polish units from Kobryń and Brześć were soon joined by the Podlaska Cavalry Brigade. The unit, commanded by General , successfully evaded encirclement by withdrawing through the Białowieża Forest. General Kmicic-Skrzyński, with his chief of staff, Major Julian Szychiewicz, went to Vawkavysk where he made telephone contact with General Kleeberg. The two agreed to join their forces and move southwards, towards the Romanian Bridgehead.

The 16th Motorized Infantry Regiment with artillery and Luftwaffe support, began an attack on the positions of the 83rd Polish Infantry Regiment on 18 September, capturing a number of Polish positions. The Polish counter-attack, which began at 17.00 hours, regained some territory. General Kleeberg began withdrawing his forces to Romania and Hungary. Over the next two days Polish forces were ordered to concentrate north of Kowel. While on the march, a formation of the Polesie Group was attacked by fifth columnists and from the air, but loose groups of Polish soldiers joined the group.

After a battle with Red Army forces, General Kleeberg decided to march to the relief of Warsaw on 22 September. He first planned to capture crossing places on the Bug River. The concentration area would be near Włodawa. Formations, organized by Colonel Brzoza-Brzezina, fought only against the Germans. They could fight the Red Army but only if they, the Poles, were attacked first. Between 22 and 25 September, elements of the Polesie Group were attacked by German aircraft during the march to Włodawa. On the last day of these attacks, General Kleeberg received information that Włodawa had been captured by unknown Polish units. Most personnel were soldiers from destroyed Polish formations who had not been caught by the Germans and were looking for commanders and formations which still fought. His staff began organizing the defense of a bridgehead in Włodawa.

Elsewhere, between 17 and 26 September, formations of the Polesie Group crossed the Bug river and entered an area near Włodawa. After receiving information about the surrender of Warsaw, General Kleeberg asked his commanders their opinion after informing them of the political and military situation. He also asked General Zygmunt Podhorski, the commander of the 'Zaza' cavalry division (comprising two brigades of cavalry ['Pils' and 'Edward'], two infantry battalions ['Olek' and 'Wilk'] and divisional artillery), to join him.  General Podhorski agreed but then decided that he would first go to Stawy near Dęblin, the location of the main arsenal of the Polish army. They would then move to the Holy Cross Mountains and engage in guerrilla warfare.

Kleeberg decided to re-organize his command. The 'Kobryń' division would get little in the way of re-supply but would be renamed the 60th Infantry Division. The 'Brzoza' and 'Drohiczyn' groups would be merged – Colonel Brzoza-Brzezina would command the resultant 50th Infantry Division with three infantry regiments and a division of artillery. The 60th Infantry Division would be commanded by Colonel Adam Epler, comprising: three infantry regiments, a division of artillery, a motorized company of 37 mm anti-tank guns, four independent and seven independent formations. In all, Kleeberg had some 18,000 men.

On 28 September, the Polish forces began to march south to the Parczew-Wojcieszków line with the 'Zaza' cavalry division securing the march. One of the Uhlan regiments from the 'Edward' brigade successfully crossed the Wieprz river and captured Spiczyn; another cavalry regiment from the 'Zaza' Division captured Jawidz and Wymysłów after some resistance. The Germans suffered heavy losses. The next day there was more fighting between the 'Zaza' Division and the Germans near Spiczyn. That evening, the 60th Infantry Division made contact with the Germans and entered a forest near Czeremniki. The Germans, using a formation of infantry and supported by two tanks, attacked the 1st Battalion, 182nd Infantry Regiment unsuccessfully.

By 30 September, Polish forces were situated between the rivers Tyśmienica and Wieprz. The following day, forces from the 'Polesie' Group passed the Świderki colonies of Bystrzyca, Wola Osowińska, Bełcząc and Ostrówek. The 'Zaza' Division had settled in forests near the Tyśmianka river. One squadron of the 2nd Uhlan Regiment, who were defending a road, destroyed a German reconnaissance patrol. The command element of 5th Uhlan Regiment, and the 'Olek' and 'Wilk' infantry battalions attacked the Germans in Kock and captured the town.

Battle of Kock

On 30 September, the commander of 10th Army, Walter von Reichenau, ordered his staff to plan the destruction of a large Polish force which was located between the Bug and Vistula rivers. This task would involve the XIV Motorized Corps. It was made up of the 29th Infantry Division (Wehrmacht), the 13th Motorized Infantry Division, and some independent units. Each German motorized division had a paper strength of 16445 soldiers, 2676 trucks and staff cars, 1944 motorcycles, and 18 armored cars.

2 October
General Gustav Anton von Wietersheim, the commander of the XIV Motorized Corps, knew that Polish forces were situated in the forests northwest of Kock. He believed that the commander of the Polish forces was unaware of Warsaw's capitulation.

The commander of the 13th Motorized Infantry Division, was of the opinion that the Polish forces had become so demoralized that they were incapable of combat, and that a single German battalion would be enough to disarm the Poles and take them to a prisoner of war camp. General Otto sent a force consisting of 3rd Battalion, 93rd Motorized Infantry Regiment supported by 8th Battery, 13th Regiment of Light Artillery. The battalion commander decided to divide his forces into two groups which were sent to Serokomla and Kock. He could count on help from the 93rd Motorized Infantry Regiment with some support forces which followed him.

Kock
At 08:30, a column of half-tracks and truck-mounted infantry came under fire from a guard platoon of No. 2 company of the 'Wilk' battalion. After a protracted engagement the German troops withdrew. The Polish 179th Infantry Regiment was alerted and moved to defensive positions near and in Kock. At about 11:00 the German lead elements attacked the Polish positions, which were now 2 battalions strong. In spite of supporting artillery fire, the attack failed. At dusk German motorcyclists appeared near the church in Kock and began firing, but subsequently withdrew when the fire was returned.

Serokomla
A company of motorized infantry entered the village of Serokomla. This led to the beginning of a chaotic action between the Germans and Uhlans from the 'Pils' Cavalry Brigade, (commanded by Colonel Plisowski). The Poles were supported by an artillery unit from the same brigade. The Germans were forced to withdraw to the south of the village (see 3 October).

Casualties
German losses were 300–400 killed and wounded. Five officers, 180 NCOs and privates were captured by the Poles. Components of the 'Pils' cavalry brigade lost about 200 killed or wounded.

3 October 
The stiff Polish resistance forced General Otto to use all his forces for an assault. He was going to split Polish forces in two and destroy them. He decided that the 33rd Motorized Infantry Regiment supported by part of the divisional artillery would attack Annopol, Pieńki and Talczyn. This force was tasked with destroying the Polish 50th Infantry Division. The 93rd Motorized Infantry Regiment was ordered to capture Serokomla, and then Hordzież, and to destroy a defensive formation of the 'Zaza' cavalry division. The 66th Motorized Infantry Regiment entered the field of battle in the afternoon.

General Kleeberg thought that the main German advance would be toward the 'Zaza' cavalry division at Serokomla/Hordzież. He decided that part of the cavalry would fend off the German attack. The rest would join a counter-attack alongside the 50th Infantry Division on the right wing and rear of the 13th German Motorized Infantry Division. The 60th Infantry Division and the 'Podlaska Cavalry Brigade' would close off potential German attack routes. If this counter-attack was successful, the German division would be forced to withdraw behind the river Wieprz.

Between 07:50 and 09:30, two regiments of the 50th Infantry Division (the 180th and the 178th, less its 2nd battalion), attacked. They were supported by a howitzer battery. The attack was commanded by Lieutenant Colonel Gorzkowski. Initially successful, the Polish units were halted and then forced onto the defensive. The cavalry attack by the Uhlans was also stopped and forced to withdraw west of Wola Gułowska.

At 10:30, German artillery began to fire on Polish cavalry positions. The 93rd Motorized Infantry Regiment began an attack on the 'Wilk' battalion positions, inflicting heavy losses. The 33rd Motorized Infantry Regiment began a gradual attack on the Polish 50th Infantry Division.

After heavy fighting, the German advance was stopped. General Otto decided to support the 33rd Motorized Infantry Regiment with the 2nd Battalion of the 66th Motorized Infantry Regiment. German formations captured Wola Gułowska, but in the evening, they were forced to withdraw from the eastern part of the area and go on the defensive in the west part.

4 October
Due to the 13th Motorized Infantry Division's failure, General von Wietersheim was forced to use the 29th Motorized Infantry Division. General Otto ordered the 93rd Motorized Infantry Regiment to move from the Wieprz river to Dęblin. The 66th Motorized Infantry Regiment would attack Adamów and Wola Gułowska, and the 33rd Motorized Infantry Regiment would clear the area to the north of Kock.

General Kleeberg suspected that the main combined attack of the 13th Motorized Infantry Division and the 29th Motorized Infantry Division would be on Adamów and Krzywda. He thought there was a chance to destroy the 13th Motorized Infantry Division as they had already sustained heavy casualties and materiel losses. The 'Zaza' cavalry division and the 50th Infantry Division would defend their positions, the 60th Infantry Division would attack the 13th Motorized Infantry Division. The Podlaska Cavalry Brigade would oppose the 29th Motorized Infantry Division.

In the morning, the main elements of 13th Motorized Infantry Division attacked the 'Zaza' cavalry division and the 50th Infantry division. By 12:00 noon part of the 66th Motorized Infantry Regiment had captured Zakępie and advanced on Adamów where they were halted by the 1st Battalion of the 180th Infantry Regiment.

About 11 hours apart, first from the west and then the east, forces from the 66th Motorized Infantry Regiment attacked the 'Olek' and 'Wilk' battalions who were defending Czarna. The defenders sustained heavy casualties from artillery fire and 'Wilk' was forced to withdraw to the eastern edge of the Adamów forest. 'Olek', moving to Adamów, later deployed to Gułów. Between 10:00 and 11:00 formations of the 66th Motorized Infantry Regiment attacked formations of cavalry from the 5th Uhlan Regiment who then withdrew from Wola Gułowska and Adamów to the south-east.

At about 12:00 the 66th Motorized Infantry Regiment attacked the 2nd Squadron of the 2nd Uhlan Regiment in Zarzecze which withdrew with heavy casualties. The commander of the regiment moved the 4th Squadron south from Helenów to try to assist the 2nd Squadron while the 3rd Squadron held the enemy to the west of Wola Gułowska. The 3rd and 4th Squadrons, with elements of the 10th Uhlan Regiment fought near the Turzystwo village cemetery and the church in Wola Gułowska. Ground was lost and regained repeatedly until an attack by the 2nd Battalion, 184th Infantry Regiment and the Uhlan Squadron enabled the Polish to dig in.

5 October
General von Wietersheim decided that he would use two of his divisions. They would attempt to encircle and destroy the Polish forces. The 13th Motorized Infantry Division advanced on Bystrzyca and Adamów then Nowa Wróblina and Stanin; the 29th Motorized Division advanced on Radoryż Kościelny and Nowa Wróblina where they met troops from the 13th Motorized Infantry Division.

General Kleeberg decided to destroy the 13th Motorized Infantry Division by using forces from the 50th and 60th infantry divisions and the 'Zaza' cavalry division. The Podlaska Cavalry Brigade defended the position under Radoryż Kościelny and Nowa Wróblina.

Fighting in Wojcieszków, Gułów and Adamów
The 13th Motorized Infantry Division's artillery began to fire on the 180th Infantry Regiment battalion's positions in Adamów and the 'Olek' Battalion in Gułów grange at 05:30. Two and a half hours later, the 66th Motorized Infantry Regiment's advance began. After a short fight at 10:00, the Germans captured Adamów, they then attacked the Polish position on hill 170 and Gułów, which they captured after heavy fighting. The 66th Motorized Infantry Regiment took many losses.  The division occupied positions on the eastern edge of Adamów forest. General Podhorski sent the 'Pils' cavalry brigade to support them. After contact with the enemy brigade, they began an attack on the German positions in the forest. They captured the forest and, there, they established defensive positions.

The Polish 178th Infantry Regiment withdrew. The commander ordered his force to re-take Wojcieszków and Glinne, which they did, but they withdrew after taking heavy losses. The advance of the 180th Infantry Regiment on Adamów failed. Colonel Brzoza-Brzezina sent the 178th infantry regiment who soon met the German advance. The 1st battalion included a part company of sappers. The 2nd and 3rd battalions took heavy losses and withdrew to Burzec.

Meanwhile, an attack by the Polish 184th infantry regiment, with the support of a battalion of the 179th infantry regiment, recaptured the church and cemetery in Wola Gułowska. An advance by the 182nd Infantry Regiment with the help of three 100mm howitzers broke the German defense in Helenów.

At 16:00, the last German advance from Adamów began on positions of the 10th Uhlan Regiment in Krzywda forest by the 182nd regiment in Helenów and the 184th regiment in Wola Gułowska. The 10th Uhlan Regiment, after a hard fight, withdrew into the forest. Most forces of the 'Brzoza' division successfully defended their positions in Burzec. The 182nd Infantry Regiment held their position. The 184th regiment had to withdraw due to a lack of artillery ammunition. During this time two key Polish advances began. The 2nd battalion of the 183rd Infantry Regiment, with artillery support, began an assault with the bayonet on the Germans who had attacked the southern wing of the 'Pils' cavalry brigade.

The assault succeeded and the Germans began to retreat, being chased by infantry and cavalry. The rear of the southern wing of the 13th Motorized Infantry Division was attacked by the 'Edward' cavalry brigade, they captured the village of Poznań, including a German artillery battery (which had to be destroyed when the cavalry were forced to withdraw due to them coming under fire from another German artillery battery). Elements of the 13th Motorized Infantry Division began to withdraw. One of the last attacks was by the 29th Motorized Division on the 'Podlaska' Cavalry Brigade positions and the rear of the 'Brzoza' Division. After that both Polish formations withdrew to the south of Krzywda.

At 16:30, General Kleeburg gave his last order in Hordzieżka, and then, as the Hordzieżka forest was being shelled, returned to his headquarters in Krzywda. At 20:40, Lieutenant Colonels Kazimierz Gorzkowski and Tadeusz Śmigielski left to establish contact with the command staff of the 13th Motorized Infantry Division. They made contact with the Germans near Adamów, and both sides agreed to a ceasefire lasting until 6 October (the next day) at 06:00, before which time a surrender was to be concluded.

Independent Operational Group Polesie surrendered on 6 October at 10:00. In his last order, General Kleeberg wrote that the reason for his decision to capitulate was that they were surrounded and ammunition and food were depleted.

General Kleeberg's ceremonial surrender took place on 6 October at the Jabłonowskich Palace in Kock.

See also 

 List of World War II military equipment of Poland
 List of German military equipment of World War II

References

Further reading
 Jan Wróblewski "Samodzielna grupa operacyjna "Polesie" 1939", Wojskowy Instytut Historyczny, Warsaw 1989.
 Marian Porwit "Komentarze do historii polskich działań obronnych 1939", Volume 3 "Czytelnik", Warsaw 1973.
 Stanley S.Seidner, Marshal Edward Śmigły-Rydz Rydz and the Defense of Poland, New York, 1978.

External links 

Battles of the Invasion of Poland
Lublin Voivodeship (1919–1939)
October 1939 events